Howth Castle and estate lie just outside the village of Howth, County Dublin in Ireland, in the administration of Fingal County Council. The castle was the ancestral home of the line of the St Lawrence family (see: Earl of Howth) that had held the area since the Norman Invasion of 1180, and held the title of Lord of Howth until circa 1425, the Baron Howth to 1767, then Earl of Howth until 1909.  The castle and estate are held since 1909 by their distaff heirs, the Gaisford-St Lawrence family.

The estate includes much of the peninsula of Howth Head, including extensive heathland and much of Howth's cliff walks, with views over Dublin Bay, light woodland, and the island of Ireland's Eye.  On the grounds near the castle are golf, pitch and putt and footgolf facilities, a former hotel, formal gardens and a pond, rhododendron walks - and several small streams pass through the estate.

In October 2018, the family announced their agreement to sell the castle, demesne and Ireland's Eye to the Tetrarch investment group who intended to redevelop the hotel and course as a luxury resort. A 7-acre portion of the site zoned for residential development close to the castle gate was sold onwards by Tetrarch to Glenveagh Homes for €14m after the sale closed. Glenveagh's interim financial report notes they intend to build 200 apartments on the site with first deliveries in 2023.

History
Since 1180 the St Lawrence family were the feudal lords of Howth. The original family castle, a timber structure, was sited on the edge of Howth village, on Tower Hill, overlooking Balscadden Bay. In some form, Howth Castle has stood on its present site for over 750 years. The great English architect Sir Edwin Lutyens in 1911 restyled a 14th-century castle built here, overlooking Ireland's Eye and the north Dublin coastline.

The estate previously included much of coastal northern Dublin, including the lands of Kilbarrack, Raheny and parts of Clontarf, but these were gradually sold off from the mid-19th to the mid-20th century.

In the second half of the 20th century, the castle's demesne was largely redeveloped to provide golfing facilities, and a mid-price hotel, with bar, restaurant and spa facilities, was opened.

In the early 21st century the Castle saw the opening of a cookery school, and later a cafe, and was occasionally available for guided tours.

In October 2018, Julian Gaisford St-Lawrence announced that the family had agreed to sell the property to a private investment group. The golf club and related facilities would remain open through 2019, the hotel would be redeveloped and reopened as a luxury property, and residential development would be possible.  No details were given on whether the family would retain some land, or a life right to live in the castle, or of the future of the volunteer-operated Transport Museum located on the grounds.

Legend
A popular legend about the castle concerns an incident that allegedly occurred in 1576. During a trip from Dublin, the Gaelic chieftain and "pirate queen" Gráinne O'Malley attempted to pay a courtesy visit to the 8th Baron Howth.  However, she was informed that the family was at dinner and the castle gates were closed against her. In retaliation, she abducted the grandson and heir, the 10th Baron.  He was eventually released when a promise was given to keep the gates open to unexpected visitors and to set an extra plate at every meal.  At Howth Castle today, this agreement is still honoured by the descendants of the Baron.

Grounds

In 1892 Rosa Mulholland referred to the grounds thus:
"Back on the lower land you must visit the ancient demesne of the Earl of Howth, where a quaint old castle stands in a prim garden with swan-inhabited pond, and plashing fountain, encircled by dark beautiful woods full of lofty cathedral-like aisles, moss carpeted, and echoing with the cawing of rooks."(Mulholland 1892: 35)

The grounds near the castle are noted for the wild rhododendron gardens, which are open to the public in summer, and some of the oldest beech hedges in Ireland, planted in 1710. At certain times, such as summer 2016, guided tours of the castle could be booked at weekends. As late as the mid-20th century, there was a rock garden near the Church of Ireland parish church, a "sundial garden" near the main entrance gate, an orchard and a moat and the site of a well or spring in front of the castle; all of these features later fell into disuse.  A small sunken garden lay beside the castle's chapel wing, and a formal garden, of which parts remain, behind it, with a walk cutting through to the Swan Pond, beside which was a fern garden.

The Bloody Stream ran in front of the castle, another stream used to pass directly by, and was later captured by castle drainage, and a third was connected to the Swan Pond. One of the streams in Sutton also comes from within the estate.

The more remote parts of the estate are treated as more or less public land, with walking trails, and are substantially subject to a Special Amenity Area Order.

In the 20th century, the 17th classical landscape was substantially modified to make the Deer Park golf courses, which had an associated hotel, the Deer Park Hotel, for many years.

The "Kitchen in the Castle Cookery School" was opened by two members of the family, based in the restored Georgian kitchens of Howth Castle.

The volunteer-operated National Transport Museum of Ireland is located in the grounds of the castle. It features lorries, trucks, fire engines and tractors. Also exhibited is the restored Hill of Howth No.9 Tram.

Howth Park Racecourse (1829 - 1842)
In 1829 a racecourse was established in the castle grounds by Thomas St Lawrence, 3rd Earl of Howth who had a particular passion for horses. The course was known as Howth Park Racecourse and ran from the backgate lodge of the castle on Carrickbrack Road down to the corner of the grounds of Seafield House (now Santa Sabina school) and North broadly along the route of Offington before circling Corr Castle and returning up along the Howth Road.

The races were attended by all the leading owners, trainers and jockeys of the day with the race-card paying testament to the importance of the occasion. A sample of attendees from 1838 included Lord Howth, Lord Sligo, Sir John Kennedy, Captain Burke and Burnell and the Lord Lieutenant of Ireland, Constantine Phipps, 1st Marquess of Normanby. Although initially only members of respected racing clubs (Howth Park Club or the Corinthians Club at the Curragh) and gentry were allowed to enter, in 1834 access expanded to include a Tradesmen's Cup and in 1839 a Citizens' Plate. The races stopped permanently at Howth in 1842, likely due to the death of Emily, first wife of the Lord Howth however racing did eventually recommence post the Great Famine nearby at Baldoyle Racecourse from 1853 onward. Notable races included the St.Lawrence Stakes and the Vaughan Goblet.

Popular culture

Literature

The locale of James Joyce's 1939 novel Finnegans Wake is "Howth Castle and Environs," which is taken to mean Dublin, and it begins and ends with a reference to this. The initials HCE appear in many contexts in the novel, not least in the name of its presumed main character, Humphrey Chimpden Earwicker.

There are also more than a dozen references to Howth, its team and the rhododendron walks near the castle, in Ulysses.

Film location
Howth Castle was depicted as the fictitious "Castle Haloran" from the 1963 Roger Corman and Francis Ford Coppola b-film Dementia 13 (a.k.a. The Haunted and the Hunted) where it was the setting of numerous scenes.

Flashback scenes from the Sergio Leone Spaghetti Western, Duck, You Sucker were shot here. The castle was used extensively for exterior shots in Love & Friendship, Whit Stillman's adaptation of the Jane Austen novel Lady Susan. Howth castle was also featured prominently in the 2021 Hallmark movie "As Luck Would Have It."

References

 Mulholland, R. (1892). "At Howth." The Irish Monthly 20(223): 33-7.

External links

Howth Castle 
Official site
Information on the site from megalithomania.com
Photos and video on humphrysfamilytree.com

Castles in Fingal
Castle
Museums in Dublin (city)
Tourist attractions in Fingal
Works of Edwin Lutyens in Ireland
Former horse racing venues in the Republic of Ireland
Buildings listed on the Fingal Record of Protected Structures